Axel Gnos (born 30 April 2003) is a Swiss-French racing driver of Vietnamese descent, who drives for G4 Racing in the Formula Regional European Championship.

Career

Lower formulae 
Gnos made his car racing debut in the 2018 Italian F4 Championship with AS Motorsport, where he raced in two rounds. In 2019 he drove in both the Italian and Spanish F4 championships, for Jenzer Motorsport and G4 Racing respectively. He had a successful campaign in the Spanish series, where he finished on the podium twice and ended his season sixth in the drivers' standings.

In 2020 Gnos once again competed in the Italian F4 Championship with G4 Racing, where he placed 23rd in the championship, having scored six points.

Toyota Racing Series 
The Swiss driver raced in the Toyota Racing Series for Kiwi Motorsport at the start of the 2020 season. He scored 15 points and finished 18th in the standings, last of all full-time drivers.

Formula Regional European Championship 
In February 2021 it was announced that Gnos would be competing in the Formula Regional European Championship with G4 Racing. His season would ultimately prove to be fruitless, with Gnos scoring a best finish of 14th at Barcelona and finishing 28th in the standings.

For the 2022 season, the Swiss driver remained with his father's team, G4, this time partnering Matías Zagazeta and Owen Tangavelou. Following a challenging campaign, during which the Swiss driver missed a round following a crash at Spa-Francorchamps, Gnos confirmed that he would be leaving the team and the series after the end of the season, which he ended in 31st place.

Karting record

Karting career summary

Racing record

Career summary 

* Season still in progress.

Complete Italian F4 Championship results
(key) (Races in bold indicate pole position) (Races in italics indicate fastest lap)

Complete F4 Spanish Championship results 
(key) (Races in bold indicate pole position) (Races in italics indicate fastest lap)

Complete Toyota Racing Series results 
(key) (Races in bold indicate pole position) (Races in italics indicate fastest lap)

Complete Formula Regional European Championship results 
(key) (Races in bold indicate pole position) (Races in italics indicate fastest lap)

References

External links 
 

2003 births
Living people
Swiss racing drivers
Italian F4 Championship drivers
ADAC Formula 4 drivers
Spanish F4 Championship drivers
Toyota Racing Series drivers
Formula Regional European Championship drivers
Jenzer Motorsport drivers
MP Motorsport drivers
Sportspeople from Lausanne